The Other is a psychological horror novel by American writer Thomas Tryon, published in 1971. It was his debut novel. 

Tryon, who had been a working actor, retired from his Hollywood career to become a novelist. Upon its release, the novel received wide critical acclaim and became a surprise bestseller. The Other was adapted into a 1972 film of the same name directed by Robert Mulligan and starring Uta Hagen. The novel was reprinted in a commemorative edition in 2012 by New York Review Books with an afterword by Dan Chaon.

Plot
Set in 1935, the novel focuses on the sadistic relationship between two 13-year-old and identical twin boys: one of whom is well behaved while the other is a sociopath who wreaks havoc on his family's rural New England farm property.

Reception

References

1971 American novels
Alfred A. Knopf books
American novels adapted into films
American horror novels
English-language novels
Fictional twins
Novels about mental health
Novels set in New England
Novels set in the 1930s
Novels set in Connecticut
Psychological novels
Psychological horror
Twins in fiction
Fiction set in 1935
1971 debut novels